Carandiru is a metro station on São Paulo Metro Line 1-Blue, located in the district of Santana, in São Paulo. It was opened on 26 September 1975.

Location

Located in Avenida Cruzeiro do Sul, 2487, in the district of Santana, North Side of São Paulo. It is next to the location of the old Carandiru Penitentiary, stage of many crises of the penitentiary system during more than 20 years, deactivated and imploded in 2002 to give place to Youth Park (Parque da Juventude).

Characteristics

It is an elevated station with structure in apparent concrete, prefabricated cover in concrete, and two side platforms. It also has, besides the access, two gates on each side of the platforms, in a way that the passenger who leaves the train in a platform cannot take the train on the opposite side without paying another fee.

It has  of built area and capacity for 20,000 passengers per hour during peak hours.

References

São Paulo Metro stations
Railway stations opened in 1975
1975 establishments in Brazil